Gillett Grove Township is a township in Clay County, Iowa, USA.  As of the 2000 census, its population was 385.

History
Gillett Grove Township was created in 1873.

Geography
According to the USGS, it contains one cemetery, Rosehill.

The streams of Elk Creek and Lexington Creek run through this township.

Notes

References
 USGS Geographic Names Information System (GNIS)

External links
 US-Counties.com
 City-Data.com

Townships in Clay County, Iowa
Townships in Iowa